Laura Kaminsky  (born September 28, 1956) is an American composer, producer of musical and multi-disciplinary cultural events, and educator. She was born in New York City, graduated from the High School of Music and Art, and studied with Joseph Wood at Oberlin College and Mario Davidovsky at City College of New York. She graduated from City College/CUNY with a Master of Arts degree in composition in 1980.

Career
Kaminsky has maintained an active composing studio and has had her music performed internationally. She is the recipient of numerous prestigious awards and fellowships.  In addition, her music has been extensively recorded. She has received national recognition for her innovative cultural programming and has held posts at a number of important institutions including New York City's 92nd Street Y, Town Hall, and Symphony Space, where she is currently artistic director. In 1984 she co-founded and remains the artistic director of the new music collective, Musicians Accord, which is in residence at City College of New York, where the ensemble members work with Professor David Del Tredici and his graduate composition students.

From 1992-93 Kaminsky lived and worked in Ghana, where she taught at the National Academy of Music and produced a series of concerts, including a conference on African Music: Tradition and Innovation. From 1996-97 she served as director of the European Mozart Academy, an international post-graduate music fellowship program based in Poland that brought together talented young musicians from Western and Eastern Europe to study and perform in concerts across Eastern Europe in the aftermath of the dissolution of the Soviet Union. From 1999-2004 she served as chair of the music department at the Cornish College of the Arts in Seattle, and from 2004-08 was dean of the Conservatory of Music at Purchase College State University of New York when she left to assume the post of artistic director of New York City's multi-disciplinary performing arts center, Symphony Space, succeeding its founding director, Isaiah Sheffer.  In addition, she continues to teach composition and arts management at Purchase College.

Personal life
Kaminsky is the daughter of Dr. Leonard Kaminsky, a dentist, and Eva D. Kaminsky, who managed her husband's dental practice. Her mother is from London and her father is from The Bronx. In 2011, Kaminsky married painter Rebecca Allan.

Works
Kaminsky has a large catalog of works, and composes mostly chamber and vocal music. Selected works include:

Operas:

 Some Light Emerges
 As One

Orchestral:

 Terra Terribilis: Concerto for Three Percussionists and Orchestra
 Piano Concerto

String Quartets:

 Transformations
 Transformations II: Music for a Changing World
 Monotypes
 American Nocturne
 Cadmium Yellow

Chamber Music:

 Vukovar Trio
 Duo for Flute and Piano
 Duo for Cello and Piano
 Wave Hill for Violin and Piano
 And Trouble Came: An African AIDS Diary
 Twilight Settings
 Proverbs of Hell
 Whence it Comes
 Inerpolations on Utopia Parkway

Solo Piano:

 Fantasy
 Music for Artur
 Calendar Music
 Triftmusik
 Danza Piccola

Other solo works:

 The Great Unconformity (cello)
 Isole (cello)
 Until a Name (flute)

Songs:

 Rise, My Love
 Whitman Songs

References

External links
 Complete catalog of Works

1956 births
20th-century classical composers
American women classical composers
American classical composers
American music educators
American women music educators
Living people
21st-century American composers
21st-century classical composers
Musicians from New York City
Fiorello H. LaGuardia High School alumni
Oberlin College alumni
City College of New York alumni
Cornish College of the Arts faculty
State University of New York at Purchase faculty
Pupils of Mario Davidovsky
American opera composers
Women opera composers
20th-century American women musicians
20th-century American composers
21st-century American women musicians
Classical musicians from New York (state)
20th-century women composers
21st-century women composers
American women academics